Ora is the twelfth studio album by Italian singer-songwriter Jovanotti, released by Universal Music on 25 January 2011.

The album debuted atop the Italian Albums Chart and peaked at number one for three consecutive weeks. The album was preceded by the single "Tutto l'amore che ho", released on 2 December 2010, which peaked at number one on the FIMI Singles Chart. It also spawned the top-10 singles "Le tasche piene di sassi", "Il più grande spettacolo dopo il Big Bang", "La notte dei desideri" and "Ora".

Background
During the presentation of the album, which took place on the top floor of the Pirelli skyscraper in Milan, It has now been defined by Jovanotti himself as "an album where I try to enter modernity, to be contemporary, particularly in the sounds." Jovanotti has also expressed about the sound of the disc, saying that "it sounds very electronic, and I realized in a primordial way. Alone, with machines, samplers, turntables, drums and keyboards"

Track listing

Charts and certifications

Charts

Year-end charts

Certifications

References

2011 albums
Jovanotti albums
Universal Music Italy albums
Italian-language albums
Albums produced by Michele Canova